USS Planter may refer to the following ships of the United States Navy:

 , a side-wheel steamer built at Charleston, South Carolina, in 1860
 , acquired by the U.S. Navy 4 April 1944.

References 

United States Navy ship names